Jessica Albery (1908–1990) was a British architect and town planner, and one of the first generation of professional women architects in the UK in the early 20th century.

Early life and education 
Jessica Albery was born in London on 11 June 1908, the daughter of the stockbroker and Conservative MP for Gravesend, Kent, Irving Albery, a stockbroker who was later Conservative MP for Gravesend (1924–45) and was knighted in 1936, and his wife, Gertrude Mary, née Jones (1884–1967). Both parents came from theatrical families, her paternal grandparents were actress and theatrical manager Mary Moore (later Lady Wyndham) and actor and playwright James Albery. Her maternal grandfather was playwright Henry Arthur Jones, a creative artistic background which inspired her. Her mother encouraged her to study architecture, but her parents did not expect her to become a 'serious professional'. She trained at the Architectural Association, London, for five years in the late 1920s alongside students and close friends Judith Ledeboer, Justin Blanco White, and Mary Crowley (later Medd), where they developed a commitment to housing reform and social concerns which impacted their later careers.

Works and career 
As there was little work available at the time when she completed her training, she began her career by observing buildings under construction in the City of London, in particular Sir Edwin Cooper's Royal Mail Office. At this time she worked for several months with her fellow student and friend Judith Ledeboer. During the 1930s she worked as an architect in Ledeboer's office and also in that of another former Architectural Association student, Judith Townsend. It was in this period that she designed and built five chalk pisé houses, influenced by the Arts and Crafts style, near Andover, Hampshire; these were built by local labourers under a foreman supervised by Albery, drawing on her experience of working on building sites.

During the Second World War Jessica Albery moved into working on town planning, for example, with Max Lock at Middlesbrough. After the war, she worked on architecture and town planning projects in Basildon New Town created under the 1946 New Towns Act    and later became assistant regional planning officer to the Ministry of Town and Country Planning. 

Albery also  Albery was a member of the Royal Institute of British Architects Housing Group and a co-author, along with Ledeboer, Jane Drew and Elizabeth Denby, of an influential report in 1944. Her interest and experience in this area are evident in an unbuilt competition entry dating from about 1946 for housing on the site of Churchill Gardens in Pimlico (ultimately occupied by a scheme designed by Powell & Moya).

Personal life 
Albery did not marry but adopted two very young boys in the early 1950s. Between 1953-54 she built the Garden House for them in Farningham, Kent, where her parents lived. She later designed the village hall in the village.

She died on 16 January 1990 at her home in Farningham.

References 

1908 births
1990 deaths
British women architects
20th-century British architects
British urban planners
Alumni of the Architectural Association School of Architecture
Architects from London